Jimwhitfieldius is a genus of braconid wasps in the family Braconidae. There are at least two described species in Jimwhitfieldius.

Species
These two species belong to the genus Jimwhitfieldius:
 Jimwhitfieldius jamesi Fernandez-Triana & Boudreault, 2018 (Thailand, Vietnam)
 Jimwhitfieldius sydneyae Fernandez-Triana & Boudreault, 2018 (Thailand)

References

Microgastrinae